USS LST-283 was a  in the United States Navy during World War II. She was later sold to the Peruvian Navy and renamed BAP Chimbote (LT-34).

Construction and commissioning 
LST-283 was laid down on 2 August 1943 at American Bridge Company, Ambridge, Pennsylvania. Launched on 10 October 1943 and commissioned on 18 November 1943.

Service in the United States Navy 
During World War II, LST-283 was assigned to the Europe-Africa-Middle East theater. She took part in the Invasion of Normandy from 6 to 25 June 1944. She also took part in Operation Dragoon from 15 August to 13 September 1944. LST-283 was later assigned to the Asiatic-Pacific Theater, serving from 20 September to 20 November 1945. She was decommissioned on 13 June 1946 and struck from the Naval Register on 22 January 1947. On 25 March 1947, she was sold to Northrup H. Castle, Honolulu, Hawaii and renamed M/S Rawhiti.

Service in the Peruvian Navy 
The Peruvian Navy purchased the ship on 21 December 1951 and renamed to BAP Chimbote (LT-34). She was later renumbered (DT-142).

She was decommissioned in 1984.

Awards 
LST-283 have earned the following awards:

American Campaign Medal
Europe-Africa-Middle East Campaign Medal (2 battle stars)
Asiatic-Pacific Campaign Medal 
World War II Victory Medal 
Navy Occupation Service Medal (with Asia clasp)

Citations

Sources 
 
 
 
 

LST-1-class tank landing ships
Ships built in Ambridge, Pennsylvania
World War II amphibious warfare vessels of the United States
1943 ships
Ships transferred from the United States Navy to the Peruvian Navy
Amphibious warfare vessels of the Peruvian Navy